Live at the Opera is the first live album by the Norwegian black metal band Satyricon, originally released in 2015 under the Austrian label Napalm Records.

It consists of a digipak with two CD and one bonus DVD on limited edition, both with the same songs. Additionally, the album was released in a special edition of three vinyl records.

Background 
In February 2015, the frontman Satyr explained how the concept (new label, new DVD) came together: “The whole thing started with us doing one song, 'To the Mountains' a year and a half before the actual show. We performed at a closed event in the main hall of the opera with the Chorus of the Norwegian Opera and Ballet (Den Norske Opera & Ballett Operakoret). It was very inspirational. I then said to the conductor that I would love to do a whole show like this. He loved the idea, I was serious about it, and he was serious about it.”  

Live at the Opera comes from a nearly two-hour special live performance, which was shot and edited on DVD. The exclusive show was held on September 8, 2013 at the Oslo Opera House (Operahuset) in Norway, as part of the Ultima Oslo Contemporary Music Festival held annually.

It presents the outstanding participation of 55 singers from the Chorus of the Norwegian Opera & Ballet (Operakoret).

Track listing (CD and bonus DVD) 
 All songs written by Sigurd "Satyr" Wongraven, except where noted.

Personnel

Satyricon 
 Satyr  - Vocals, guitar
 Frost  - Drums

Additional musicians 
 Anders Odden - Bass
 Anders Hunstad - Keyboards
 Gildas Le Pape - Guitar
 Steinar Gundersen - Guitar
 Sivert Høyem - Vocals on "Phoenix"
 The Norwegian National Opera Chorus - Choir
 Kristin Rustad Høiseth - Soprano
 Rolf Sostmann - Tenor

Production and Engineering 
 Graphics by Martin Kvamme
 Mastered by George Tanderø
 Mixed by Erik Ljunggren
 Photography Espen Ixtlan and Kaleidoscope
 Recording by Steven Grant Bishop
 Printed by Optimal Media GmbH

Charts

References

External links
 Live at the Opera at Discogs
 Encyclopaedia Metallum

2015 live albums
Napalm Records live albums
Satyricon (band) albums
Indie Recordings albums